Amy Elizabeth Pearson (born 19 July 1985) is an English singer-songwriter. Her debut album, "Who I Am", was released April 2008.

Early life 
Pearson was born on 19 July 1985 in Birmingham, England. Whilst signed to a production company called P.O.E.T Productions run by ex-Take That session musician and songwriters Neil Oldfield and Neil Evington, Pearson was introduced to and began working closely with SonyBMG Australia's future A&R director, former Australian Idol judge Jay Dee Springbett. As a result, Pearson moved to Australia and signed to SonyBMG in 2004 at 18 years of age. Pearson commenced work on her debut album, which was recorded across 2006 and 2007.

Music career

2006–2010: Sony BMG
In 2006, Pearson recorded a song with the first Australian Idol winner, Guy Sebastian titled "We Both Know", which was featured on Home: Songs of Hope & Journey to raise funds and bring attention to beyondblue. That same year, a song written by Pearson called "Some Kind of Beautiful" was recorded by Canadian Idol fourth-season winner Eva Avila and was a track on Avila's debut album Somewhere Else. Pearson also recorded a cover of Joy to the World for the compilation The Spirit of Christmas 2007.

In late 2006, Pearson began working on her debut album Who I Am, originally set for release in late 2007, but was pushed back to early 2008. Three singles were released from the album; "Don't Miss You" and "Not Me" in 2007, and "Ready to Fly" in 2008. "Don't Miss You" was a top 20 hit and certified Gold.

Pearson attended the world premiere for Lord Richard Attenborough's film Closing the Ring, for which she sings the main single "Lost Without Your Love", which she stated will be released in 2008. Pearson is also featured on Seany B's single "B Good 2 Me".

In early 2008, Pearson starred in television commercials on Australian network 7 singing "Ready to Fly". The advertisement digitally places her atop the Great Wall of China, endorsing the commencement of the 2008 Olympic Games. An alternate version of Ready to Fly, a duet with Indonesian singer Rio Febrian, is available with a music video on YouTube.

The album, Who I Am, was released in Japan in late 2008, with Pearson travelling there to promote it.

According to her Twitter account in 2008, she had been in LA working with producers The Heavyweights and Rodney Jerkins, who had recently worked with Lady Gaga, Beyoncé and on Anastacia's fourth studio album Heavy Rotation, and Sheppard Solomon, who has worked with Natalie Imbruglia and Kelly Clarkson, among others. Confirmed tracks included "Doctor Love" and "Aftershock", co-written with production team Dreamlab consisting of singer-songwriter Leah Haywood and her husband Daniel James.

Also, along with Klaus Derendorf and Tom Nichols, Pearson also shares a writing credit in British singer and actress Dani Harmer's debut single "Free", which was released in the UK on 25 May 2009, taken from Harmer's upcoming album. The song was originally recorded by Pearson herself and was made an iTunes-only B-side of her single "Don't Miss You" in 2007.

The first single from the second album, "Butterfingers" was released in October 2009 and failed to chart in Australia, leading Pearson to part with Sony BMG in January 2010.

2010–present
In 2010, Pearson wrote the club number 1 and ARIA top 10 hit "Freefallin" with Denzal Park and performed by Zoe Badwi. "Freefallin" earned Pearson and Park an APRA Dance Work of 2011 award in June 2011 and an ARIA nomination.

Pearson's song "Aftershock" from her cancelled second album, was covered by Demi Lovato and features as a bonus track on the latter's third album Unbroken, released on 20 September 2011. (Japan Only Exclusive, aside from "Yes I Am").

In December 2011, Pearson joined forces with Sony/ATV publishing signing a worldwide contract and beginning a new career in the UK and most recently wrote "Good Love" with DEVolution and performs vocals on the track.

In 2013, "Hurricane" was released by Myon & Shane54 featured by Amy Pearson. (Ride Recordings/Blackhole)

On 18 December 2017,  Last Encore featured her significant voice on "Fearless".

On 23 June 2017, she released a mid-tempo track with upbeats called "Feel U Moving", with Chris Brogan, it's pulsating time length and it's influencing dance house, pop, electronic.

On 10 August 2017, "Say What, You Want", by Chris Brogan was released, it's a spoken, loop, & twisting concrete  song for partying.

On 26 January 2018, they teamed up for the songwriting & singing, "Thinking About You" with  Selekio, it's a funk, mix, club track.

On 2018 The Audioton Next Level game was released, included the song "Hurricane" (Myon & Shane54 feat. Amy Pearson)

On 14 June 2019, released "What Do You Feel" with her collaborators, Jolyon Perch, & Mind Electric, it's a slow action, fast warping track.

On 24 October 2019, She's featured on "Rebel Love" with Murph & Perch, It's a clubhouse jam with echoes, it's considered dance, techno, rock pop.

On 11 November 2019, "Give It All" with programmers & artists of the tracks, feature J Cannons, Steve Hart. It features subtle bass and is a musical classical crossover.

Discography

Studio albums

Singles

References

External links 
 Amy Pearson (Official Site)
 Amy Pearson (Sony BMG)
 take40.com Amy Pearson Artist Profile

1985 births
Living people
APRA Award winners
English expatriates in Australia
English women pop singers
English women singer-songwriters
People from Birmingham, West Midlands
21st-century English women singers
21st-century English singers